In many Animalia, including humans, an ileocolic structure or problem is something that concerns the region of the gastrointestinal tract  from the ileum to the colon. In Animalia that have ceca, the ileocecal region is a subset of the ileocolic region, and the entire range can also be described as ileocecocolic, whereas in some Animalia, the ileocolic region contains no cecum, as the ileum joins the colon directly. 

Things that are ileocolic, ileocecal, or both include the following: 
 Ileocecal fold
 Ileocecal/ileocolic intussusception
 Ileocecal valve
 Ileocolic artery
 Ileocolic lymph nodes
 Ileocolic vein